Pierre Philippe Naftule (5 December 1960 – 19 March 2022) was a Swiss writer, producer and theatre director.

Biography

Naftule was descended from Romanian ancestry. When he returned to Switzerland, he staged three shows alongside his friend Pascal Bernheim: Le Père Noël est une ordure, Topaze, and Les dix petits nègres. After creating his own stage production studio, he took over as director of  until 1995. Alongside  and Bernheim, he led Revue genevoise two more times.

In 1995, Naftule founded the show production company Yaka Production SA alongside Alain Monnet and Gérard Mermet. The character's first show, La truie est en moi was produced in 1996. In 2018, he co-founded the Nouvelle revue de Lausanne.

During the 2010s, Naftule suffered from amyotrophic lateral sclerosis. He died in Geneva on 19 March 2022 at the age of 61.

References

1960 births
2022 deaths
Swiss writers
Swiss theatre directors
Swiss people of Romanian descent
People from the canton of Geneva